Joseph Paul Zimmerman (born June 10, 1986) is an American actor known for his role as Dylan Piper in Halloweentown franchise.

Early life
Zimmerman was born in Albuquerque, New Mexico to Kat and Harry Zimmerman, a Los Alamos-based actor. His parents divorced and he lived with his father. He is Jewish.

Filmography
Murder Between Friends (1994) as Boy
Mother's Boys (1994)
Earth 2 (1994—1995) (TV series)
Bailey Kipper's P.O.V. (1997) (TV series)
Halloweentown (1998) as Dylan Piper (TV movie)
Caroline in the City (1998) as Chuckie (one episode)
Felicity (1999) as Matthew Anderson (one episode)
Treehouse Hostage (1999) as Timmy Taylor
The Practice (2002) as Steven Jamison (two episodes)
Becker (2000) (TV Series) as Jeff (high school student)
7th Heaven (2000) as Luke (two episodes)
Halloweentown II: Kalabar's Revenge (2001) as Dylan Piper (TV movie)
That '70s Show (2002) (Steven Hyde; age 13) (two episodes)
Halloweentown High (2004) as Dylan Piper (TV movie)
Dogg's Hamlet, Cahoot's Macbeth (2005) - Director
Return to Halloweentown (2006) as Dylan Piper (TV movie)
In Plain Sight (2010) as Stranger #2
Roswell FM (2012) as Chris

References

External links

1986 births
Living people
American male child actors
American male film actors
American male television actors
Male actors from Albuquerque, New Mexico
Jewish American male actors
21st-century American Jews